Napolecano may refer to:
 Any person, thing or concept from Naples (Napoli), Italy
 Neapolitan language
 Neapolitan horse, the Napoletano breed of horse
 Carosello napoletano
 Giallo napoletano
 Mastino Napoletano
 ragù napoletano (ragù alla napoletana)
 Un turco napoletano

People with the surname
 Filippo Napoletano (c. 1587-1589 - 1629), Italian artist
 Pasqualina Napoletano (b. 1949), Italian politician
  Nina Napoletano

See also 
 Napolitano (disambiguation)
 Neapolitan (disambiguation)
 Napoli (disambiguation)
 Naples (disambiguation)
 Neapoli (disambiguation)

Italian-language surnames
Italian toponymic surnames